"November" is a song by German band Juli. It was written by band members Simon Triebel, Jonas Pfetzing, and Eva Briegel and produced by O.L.A.F. Opal for their debut album Es ist Juli (2004). The song served as the fifth and final release from the album. The physical single was limited to 6,000 copies, each with a unique serial number (as visible in the cover).

Charts

References

2005 singles
Juli (band) songs
2004 songs
Songs written by Eva Briegel
Songs written by Simon Triebel
German-language songs